Set the Record Straight is the fifteenth studio album by country singer Billy Ray Cyrus, and his first on record label Flatwoods Records. It was released on November 10, 2017. The album peaked at number 43 on the Billboard Independent Albums Charts.

Track listing

Charts

Release history

References

2017 albums
Billy Ray Cyrus albums